Events in the year 1655 in Norway.

Incumbents
Monarch: Frederick III

Events

Arts and literature
The construction of Vuku Church is completed.

Births

14 June – Cornelius Cruys, Vice Admiral of the Imperial Russian Navy (d.1727).

Deaths
20 December – Gregers Krabbe, Danish Governor-General of Norway (born 1594).

See also

References